Jessica Ching Siu Nga (born 11 February 1987) is a Hong Kong racewalking athlete. She qualified to represent Hong Kong at the 2020 Summer Olympics in Tokyo 2021, competing in women's 20 kilometres walk.

References

External links
 

1987 births
Living people
Hong Kong female racewalkers
Athletes (track and field) at the 2020 Summer Olympics
Olympic athletes of Hong Kong